Ted Nash (born December 28, 1960) is an American jazz saxophonist, flutist and composer. Born into a musical family, his uncle was saxophonist Ted Nash and his father is trombonist Dick Nash, both prominent jazz soloists and first call Hollywood studio musicians. Nash is a member of the Jazz at Lincoln Center Orchestra directed by Wynton Marsalis. He is one of the founders of the Jazz Composers Collective.

Music career
Nash grew up in Los Angeles. His father is trombonist Dick Nash and his uncle was saxophonist Ted Nash. Both were big band veterans, jazz soloists and session musicians who worked regularly with Henry Mancini and Les Brown. The younger Nash began his career on piano when he was seven, clarinet when he was 12, and alto saxophone at 13. When he was 16, he played for one week with Lionel Hampton and the following year was playing saxophone with Quincy Jones, Louis Bellson, and Don Ellis. When he was 18, he moved to New York City and became a member of the Gerry Mulligan Big Band. During the same year, he released his debut album, Conception (Concord Jazz, 1978).

In the 1980s, he worked with vibraphonist Charlie Shoemake, who had been one of his teachers. He was a member of the Mel Lewis Jazz Orchestra, for whom he played saxophone and wrote arrangements. In 1990s, he performed and recorded as sideman with Wynton Marsalis, Joe Lovano, and Ben Allison. After Allison's invitation, he joined the Herbie Nichols Project, a band which played the music of pianist Nichols.

Nash has been a composer, arranger, producer, conductor, and writer of liner notes. As a performer, he is a multireedist who has recorded on soprano saxophone, alto saxophone, tenor saxophone, clarinet, bass clarinet, flute, and piccolo.

Compositions
Portrait in Seven Shades is a seven-movement suite dedicated to seven modern painters: Claude Monet, Salvador Dalí, Henri Matisse, Pablo Picasso, Vincent van Gogh, Marc Chagall, and Jackson Pollock. The album was nominated for a Grammy Award.

Nash's album Presidential Suite: Eight Variations on Freedom (Motéma, 2016) consists of Nash's compositions interwoven with historic political speeches by Winston Churchill, Ronald Reagan, Franklin D. Roosevelt, Lyndon Johnson, John F. Kennedy, Nelson Mandela, Jawaharlal Nehru, and Aung San Suu Kyi. The speeches are read by Sam Waterston, Wynton Marsalis, Joe Lieberman, and Glenn Close. In 2017, Presidential Suite won the Grammy Award for Best Large Jazz Ensemble Album.

Discography

As leader 
 Conception (Concord Jazz, 1980)
 Out of This World (Mapleshade 1993)
 European Quartet (Elabeth, 1994)
 Rhyme & Reason (Arabesque, 1999) – rec. 1998
 Sidewalk Meeting (Arabesque, 2001) – rec. 2000
 Still Evolved (Palmetto, 2003)
 La Espada de la Noche (Palmetto, 2005)
 In the Loop (Palmetto, 2006)
 The Mancini Project (Palmetto, 2008)
 The Creep (Plastic Sax, 2012)
 Chakra (Plastic Sax, 2013)
 Presidential Suite: Eight Variations on Freedom (Motéma, 2016) – rec. 2014
 Somewhere Else: West Side Story Songs (Plastic Sax, 2019) – rec. 2018
 Transformation with Glenn Close (Tiger Turn, 2021)

As a member 
The Mel Lewis Jazz Orchestra
 The Definitive Thad Jones (Limelight, 1989)
 The Definitive Thad Jones Volume 2 - Live From The Village Vanguard (Limelight, 1990)

The Herbie Nichols Project
 Love Is Proximity (Soul Note, 1996)
 Strange City (Palmetto, 2001)

Lincoln Center Jazz Orchestra
 Live in Swing City – Swingin' with Duke (Columbia, 1999)
 A Love Supreme (Palmetto, 2005)
 Don't Be Afraid...The Music of Charles Mingus (Palmetto, 2005)
 Portrait in Seven Shades (Jazz at Lincoln Center, 2010)
 Vitoria Suite (2010)

As sideman 

With Ben Allison
 Seven Arrows (Koch, 1996)
 Medicine Wheel (Palmetto, 1998)
 Third Eye with Medicine Wheel (Palmetto, 1999)
 Riding the Nuclear Tiger Medicine Wheel (Palmetto, 2001)
 Quiet Revolution (Sonic Camera, 2016) – rec. 2015

With Louie Bellson
 Raincheck (Concord Jazz, 1978)
 Sunshine Rock (Pablo, 1978)
 The London Gig (Pablo, 1982)
 Peaceful Thunder (Musicmasters, 1992)
 Black Brown & Beige (Musicmasters, 1994)
 Cool Cool Blue  (Original Jazz Classics, 1994)
 Live from New York (Telarc, 1994) – live

With Don Ellis
 Music from Other Galaxies and Planets (Atlantic, 1977)
 Don Ellis Live at Montreux (Atlantic, 1978) – live

With Wycliffe Gordon
 The Search (Nagel Heyer, 2000) – rec. 1999
 Standards Only (Nagel Heyer, 2006) – compilation

With Wynton Marsalis
 Jump Start and Jazz (Sony Classical, 1996)
 Big Train (Sony Classical, 1999)
 Selections from Swingin' into the 21st (Columbia, 2011)

With others
 Loren Schoenberg Jazz Orchestra, Solid Ground (Musicmasters, 1988)
 Jimmy Heath, Little Man Big Band (Verve, 1992)
 Linda Eder, And So Much More (Angel, 1994)
 Vince Giordano, Goldkette Project (Circle, 1994)
 Joe Lovano, Celebrating Sinatra (Blue Note, 1996)
 Marcus Roberts, Blues for the New Millennium (Columbia, 1997)
 Tom Postilio, Dream (DRG, 1998)
 Anthony Wilson, Goat Hill Junket (1998)
 Freddie Hubbard, New Colors (Hip Bop Essence, 2001)
 Paul Weston, A Life in Music (JSP, 2009)[4CD] – compilation
 The Beach Boys, Made in California (Capitol, 2013) – box set

References

American male saxophonists
Palmetto Records artists
Living people
Arabesque Records artists
American jazz composers
1960 births
Grammy Award winners
21st-century American saxophonists
21st-century American male musicians
Jazz at Lincoln Center Orchestra members
Motéma Music artists
American jazz flautists
Mapleshade Records artists
21st-century flautists